Charco is a settlement in the west of the island of Santiago, Cape Verde. It is part of the municipality of Santa Catarina. It lies 2.5 km southeast of Ribeira da Barca and 9 km west of the municipal seat Assomada. In 2010 its population was 266.

References

Villages and settlements in Santiago, Cape Verde
Santa Catarina, Cape Verde